Bidaran-e Kohneh (also Romanized as Bīdarān-e Kohneh; also known as Bīdarān and Bīderān) is a village in Howmeh Rural District, in the Central District of Bam County, Kerman Province, Iran. At the 2006 census, its population was 365, in 84 families.

References 

Populated places in Bam County